Edward Chastain is an American professional wrestler, better known by his ring name, Iceberg. Iceberg has competed for several professional wrestling promotions, including Total Nonstop Action Wrestling (TNA) and Wrestling International New Generations (W*ING) in Japan. He later wrestled as part of The Extreme Freebird alliance. He has also held the NWA Anarchy Heavyweight Championship.

Professional wrestling career
Chastain was mentored by Abdullah the Butcher, who inspired him to use a fork as a foreign object during matches. Early in his career, Chastain faced and defeated such wrestlers as Mr. Pogo and Abdullah the Butcher. In TNA Wrestling, he was brought in by manager Don Callis to feuded with The Sandman. At TNA's fifty-third weekly pay-per-view event, Chastain defeated Norman Smiley. Chastain later lost a pay-per-view match against The Sandman. After the match, Callis ended his business arrangement with Chastain, putting on a rubber glove and then shaking his hand.

In 2003, he was one third of the alliance The Extreme Freebirds, with Tank and Ray Gordy.

After winning the NWA Anarchy Heavyweight Championship, he defended it against Mikael Judas and Phill Shatter at the NWA 60th Anniversary Show. In NWA in September 2009, he wrestled in a match which carried a stipulation that he would be forced to retire if he lost. Iceberg lost the match but then wrestled one final match under his real name, Edward Chastain, claiming that only the Iceberg character had to retire. During this match, he wore a dress shirt and tie, and the fans chanted "You're a legend!" after Chastain won the match.

Championships and accomplishments
	Atlanta Wrestling Entertainment
AWE Tag Team Championship (1 time, current) - with Tank
Continental Championship Wrestling
CCW Heavyweight Championship
CCW Brass Knuckles Championship

Extreme Wrestling Alliance
EWA Heavyweight Championship
EWA United States Championship

IWA-Deep South
IWA-Deep South Tag Team Championship (1 time) - with Tank

Pro Wrestling Evolution
PWE World Heavyweight Championship (1 time)

Peachstate Wrestling Alliance
PWA Tag Team Championship (1 time) - with Rick Michaels
 
National Wrestling Alliance
NWA Southern Tag Team Championship (1 time) - with Luke Gallows

National Wrestling Federation
NWF Heavyweight Championship

Anarchy Wrestling
NWA Anarchy Heavyweight Championship (1 time)  
NWA Anarchy Tag Team Championship (1 time) - with Slim J.

NWA Wildside
NWA Wildside Heavyweight Championship (1 time)  
NWA Wildside Tag Team Championship (2 times) - with Tank

New Age Wrestling Alliance
NEWA Hardcore Champion Championship

Starsouth Championship Wrestling Alliance
SCWA Georgia Heavyweight Championship (2 times)
SCWA Heavyweight Championship
SCWA Tag Team Championship (4 times)

Ultimate Extreme Wrestling
UEW Tag Team Championship

Wrestling International New Generations
W*ING Hardcore Championship

Footnotes

References

External links
 Online World of Wrestling profile

American male professional wrestlers
Living people
Year of birth missing (living people)
20th-century professional wrestlers
21st-century professional wrestlers
NWA Georgia Heavyweight Champions
NWA Georgia Tag Team Champions